The Central & Eastern European Youth Football Tournament, known as the CEE Cup is an annual invitational under-19 football tournament, which takes place in Czech Republic. The tournament has taken place 10 times, initially restricted to clubs from Central and Eastern Europe - the tournament has now expanded to include teams from Western Europe, Asia, North, South and Central America and Australia.

The tournament has become a staging ground for future footballing talent, such as English Premier League players Tomáš Souček, Dwight McNeil and Anthony Gordon. And German Bundesliga player Joshua Zirkzee.

The trophy is a 3D representation of the tournament's logo, designed and created by Czech blacksmith Martin Blundil - who also designed plaques given to the winners of the individual players awards at the end of each tournament.

Tournament Format 
Originally, the tournament began with 4 groups, of 4 teams - with the teams playing each other in a round-robin manner, before the top ranked teams of each group competed in a semi-final and final to determine the winner. Later tournaments however, have reduced to 2 groups of 4 teams - with the group winners taking part in the semi-finals, and the runners-up taking part in matches to determine their final rankings. The 2022 edition was limited to 2 groups of 3 teams.

Tournament Results

Award Winners

Performance

By team

By country

References 

Czech football friendly trophies
Youth football competitions
Under-19 association football competitions
Recurring events established in 2011
Recurring sporting events established in 2011